The discography of Melanie C, an English pop singer, consists of eight studio albums, two extended plays, a live albums, two remix albums, four video albums, 46 singles and 43 music videos.

Chisholm began her solo career in late 1998 by singing with Canadian rock singer Bryan Adams on the song "When You're Gone". Chisholms's solo debut album Northern Star was released in 1999 and reached number four on the UK Albums Chart and was certified triple platinum by the British Phonographic Industry (BPI). The record experienced international success; it sold over 2.5 million albums worldwide. It produced four top fives and a top twenty single, two of which reached the number-one spot in the UK. Chisholm's second album, Reason, was released in March 2003 and sold more than 500,000 copies. The album reached number five in the UK and produced one top-ten and one top-twenty single.

In 2004, Chisholm departed from Virgin and founded her own record company, Red Girl Records. Beautiful Intentions, her third album, was released in April 2005. It reached number twenty-four in the UK and number fifteen in Germany, selling more than 1.5 million copies. The album produced three singles, one of which charted at number ten in the UK, and one peak at number one in different European charts. This Time, Chisholm's fourth album, was released in April 2007 and charted at fifty-seven on the UK Albums Chart. Of the five singles released from the album one charted at number-one in some parts of Europe, and one become a top-thirty in UK and a top ten in some European chart. In November, Melanie C reunited with the Spice Girls for a world tour and to release a greatest hits album. Melanie C released her fifth solo album, The Sea, on 2 September 2011, and her first EP The Night on 13 May 2012. Stages, a musical theatre-inspired album consisting of covers, was released on 10 September 2012. Melanie C's seventh album Version of Me was released on 21 October 2016 and reached number twenty-five on the UK Albums Chart.

Chisholm's eighth studio album, Melanie C was released on 2 October 2020 and peaked at number eight, giving Melanie her third top 10 album in the UK. Chisholm followed this release in 2021 with acoustic promo singles for "Into You", "Too Much" and "Never Be the Same Again". On 3 September 2021, Chisholm released a deluxe version of her Melanie C album across all digital and streaming services. Chisholm premiered a video for her cover of "Touch Me" to accompany the new release.

Having co-written 11 UK number ones, more than any other female artist in chart history, she remains the only female performer to top the charts as a solo artist, as part of a duo, quartet and quintet. With twelve UK number one singles, including the charity single as part of The Justice Collective, she is the second female artist – and the first British female artist – with most singles at number one in the United Kingdom, and with a total of fourteen songs that have received the number one in Britain (including the double A-sides), Chisholm is the female artist with most songs at number one in the UK ranking history. Her work has earned her several awards and nominations, including a Guinness Book mention, three World Music Awards, five Brit Awards from 10 nominations, three American Music Awards, four Billboard Music Awards from six nomination, eight Billboard special awards, three MTV Europe Music Awards from seven nominations, one MTV Video Music Awards from two nomination, ten ASCAP awards, one Juno Award from two nominations, and four nominations at the Echo Awards.
Since 1996, Chisholm has sold more than 108 million records, of which 23 million as a solo artist (7 million albums and 16 million singles), and a further 85 million with Spice Girls.

Albums

Studio albums

Live albums

Video releases

Extended plays

Singles

As main artist

As featured artist

Promotional singles

Other appearances

Music videos

Main artist

As featured artist

Guest appearance

Writing credits

References

Notes

Citations

External links
Official Melanie C website

Discographies of British artists
Discography
Pop music discographies